Euryopicoris is a genus of true bugs belonging to the family Miridae.

The species of this genus are found in Europe.

Species:
 Euryopicoris fennicus Wagner, 1954 
 Euryopicoris nitidus (Meyer-Dur, 1843)

References

Miridae